Victor Kilasile Mwambalaswa (born 8 November 1952) is a Tanzanian CCM politician and Member of Parliament for Lupa constituency since 2005.

References

1952 births
Living people
Chama Cha Mapinduzi MPs
Tanzanian MPs 2005–2010
Tanzanian MPs 2010–2015
Kantalamba Secondary School alumni
Mkwawa Secondary School alumni
University of Dar es Salaam alumni